The École supérieure de journalisme (ESJ Paris; in English: Superior School of Journalism of Paris) is an institution of higher education in Paris dedicated to journalism and related studies. Its origin was in the Collège Libre des Sciences Sociales founded in 1895 by Dick May (pen name of Jeanne Weill, daughter of the rabbi of Algiers), and other supporters during the Dreyfus Affair. It was made a separate Grande École in 1899 and claims the title of the "world's first school of journalism". Intended to give students a broad knowledge of politics and economics, it did not award a separate journalism degree by name until 1910.

The University of Missouri School of Journalism also claims the title of "first in the world", but it did not open until 1908 in Columbia, Missouri in the United States.

History
The origins of this tertiary college were in the Collège Libre des Sciences Sociales, founded in 1895 by the journalist and novelist Dick May; Theophilus Funck-Brentano, a professor at École libre du sciences politiques; and Pierre du Maroussem, who taught at the Law Faculty of Paris (Sorbonne).  Especially during the Dreyfus Affair and the rise of the université populaire movement, they wanted to create a place for study of the new field of social sciences and emerging thought in economics.  They envisioned it as a place where practitioners would teach so that students would learn from more than textbooks. (May was the pen name used by Jeanne Weill, a daughter of the rabbi of Algiers.)  In 1896, May suggested a school of journalism. She and other progressive French citizens were disturbed by the inflammatory press and the discriminatory attitudes that contributed to the initial conviction of Dreyfus; they wanted to improve society by encouraging higher level work in social studies.

In 1899 three separate schools in Paris were established from the College Libre: l'École des Hautes Études Sociales, l'École des Hautes Études Internationales and l'École de Journalisme. As with other grandes ecoles, the School of Journalism broadly prepared students for work in government administration, politics and economics, not exclusively for journalism. It awarded its first named journalism degree in 1910. Among its early professors were Émile Durkheim, founder of sociology; the historian Charles Seignobos, and the economist Charles Gide, who supported economic cooperatives in agriculture and for consumers.

Today the graduate school prepares students to work in diverse positions in the media field: radio, television,  newspaper, and online websites. Faculty are all professional journalists and college professors.  The ESJ Paris has been a Grande école since 1899. Admission is based on a highly competitive process: generally students take two years of  preparatory study, a national written exam taken in sections over several weeks, and an oral exams, resulting in the students' being ranked nationally before each applies to the school of choice.

Degree :
After the completion of three years of coursework, the school awards a diploma (similar to a Master's degree in the United States).

Frequency ESJ :
Since 19 March 2007, students at ESJ Paris produce their own free webradio, which can be heard on www.frequence-esj.com .

Academic partnerships
 American University of Washington, D.C.
 African Institute of Science and Technology, Mbaise
 European Communication School of Brussels, Belgium
 Agence universitaire de la Francophonie (AUF)

Notable alumni
Henri Amouroux
Malek Boutih
Philippe Bouvard
Philippe Djian
Ghislaine Dupont
Geoffroy Lejeune
Henri Sannier
Audrey Pulvar
Gebran Tueni
Gérard de Villiers
Bernard Werber
Léon Zitrone

Notable faculty

 René Cassin
 Pierre de Coubertin
 Paul Deschanel
 Émile Durkheim
 Gabriel Fauré
 Aurélie Filippetti
 Pierre de Nolhac
 Charles Péguy
 Raymond Poincaré
 Romain Rolland
 Marcel Sembat
 Roland Sicard
 Albert Thomas
 Gilles Verdez

References

External links
 "École supérieure de journalisme", Official website
 Students' WebRadio from the ESJ Paris Powered by Frequence3

Educational institutions established in 1899
Education in Paris
Grands établissements
Journalism schools in France
1899 establishments in France